Thomas E. Matthews (born 1949) is a retired United States Army colonel who is best known for his commanding role in the Battle of Mogadishu in 1993. During the Battle of Mogadishu, Matthews and a Delta Force officer, Lt. Col. Gary Harrell commanded from the helicopter Super 6-3 circling over the battle. Matthews was the commander of 1st Battalion, 160th Special Operations Aviation Regiment (Airborne), of which 5 members of his unit were killed when two Black Hawk Helicopters were shot down by the forces of Somali warlord Mohamed Farrah Aidid. Matthews was awarded the Distinguished Flying Cross and the Air Medal by President Bill Clinton for his actions in Somalia. Matthews was an adviser for the movie Black Hawk Down about the Battle of Mogadishu and was portrayed in the movie by Glenn Morshower. Matthews later retired from military service and works in the Office of the Joint Chiefs of Staff at the Department of Defense. He currently resides in northern Virginia with his family.

References

Living people
1949 births
United States Army colonels
Military personnel from Philadelphia
Drexel University alumni
Recipients of the Distinguished Flying Medal
Recipients of the Air Medal
Battle of Mogadishu (1993)
United States Army Special Operations Command